Gageac-et-Rouillac is a commune in the Dordogne department in Nouvelle-Aquitaine in southwestern France.

A scattered village consisting of many small hamlets. Gageac is now the main village with the Mairie whilst Rouillac  has the ancient Carthusian monastery, now a private house and stand on a hill with excellent views across the Dordogne valley. The 15th-16th century Château de Gageac is a listed monument. The commune is part of the Bergerac wine-growing region.

Population

See also
Communes of the Dordogne department

References

Communes of Dordogne